This is a list of short subject film series released by Hollywood studios.

Columbia

 Academy of Motion Pictures Arts & Sciences - one special (1949)
 Alan Mowbray (1941–1942) - 2 two-reelers
 Andy Clyde (1935–1956) - 73 comedy two-reelers
 Animal Cavalcade (1952–1953) - 4 one-reel comedies, much footage recycled from earlier shorts
 Bedtime Stories for Grown-Ups (1929–1932) - 18 one-reelers with Eddie Buzzell
 Ben K. Blake Film Novelty specials: Yoo-Hoo General (1942), My Wife's An Angel (1943) & A Voice Is Born (1947)
 Bert Wheeler (1950–1951) - 2 two-reelers
 Billie Burke (1948) - 2 two-reelers
 Billy Gilbert (1943–1944) - 3 two-reelers
 Broadway Follies (1937–1938) - 5 musical one-reelers directed by Ben K. Blake
 Buster Keaton (1939–1941) - 10 two-reelers
 Candid Microphone (1948–1954) featuring Allen Funt and produced by Ben K. Blake
 Cavalcade of Broadway (1949–1952) - 12 New York nightlife shorts
 Charley Chase (1937–1940) - 20 two-reelers
 Cinescope (1939–1941) - 17 one-reel documentaries including a few travelogues by André de la Varre
 Columbia Star Comedies (those headlining one two-reeler each; these didn’t become long-term series like the Three Stooges or Andy Clyde): Charlie Murray (1935), Franklin Pangborn (1935), Guinn "Big Boy" Williams (1936), Herman Bing (1937), Danny Webb (Special, 1939), Wally Brown & Tim Ryan (together, 1949), Harry Mimo (1953), The Mischief Makers (1954, 1 two-reeler of an Our Gang type series), Girlie Whirls (starring Muriel Landers, 1957)
 Columbia Musical Novelties (1933–1934) - 8 comedy/musical two-reelers, often with dialogue entirely in rhyme.
 Columbia Specials (1936–1944)- about 9, including a Cosmocolor short Fashion Takes a Holiday (1940)
 Columbia Topnotchers (1953–1954) - set of 4 one-reel documentaries
 Columbia Tour (1936–1944) - 32 one-reel travelogues
 Community Sing (1937–1949) - 124 musical sing-a-long shorts, produced by Ben K. Blake after '40
 Court of Human Relations ((1936–1937) - 4 dramatic one-reelers produced by TruPictures.
 Eddie Foy Jr. (1945–1951) - 3 two-reelers
 El Brendel (1936–1945) - 19 two-reelers, 2 costarring Harry Langdon and 1 costarring Shemp Howard
 Film Vodvil ((1943–1946) - produced by Ben K. Blake
 Fools Who Made History (1939) - pair of dramatic two-reelers
 Football Thrills (1931) - 6 sports-reels
 George Givot and Cliff Nazarro (1943) - 2 two-reelers
 George Sidney and Charles Murray (1934) - 6 comedy two-reelers
 The Glove Slingers (1939–1943) - 12 two-reelers, with Noah Beery, Jr., David Durand, and Bill Henry alternating leads
 Gus Schilling and Richard Lane (1945–1950) - 11 two-reelers
 H. A. Ripley's Minute Mysteries (1933–1934) - 10 one-reelers produced by John Randolph Bray
 Hall Room Boys Photoplays (pre-Columbia: 1919–1923) - before Columbia started, Harry Cohn worked on this series
 Harry Langdon (1934–1945) - 22 comedy two-reelers
 Harry Von Zell (1946–1950) - 8 two-reelers
 Hugh Herbert (1943–1952) - 23 two-reelers
 Joe Besser (1938, 1949–1956) – 1 two-reeler in ’38, followed by 11 more later
 Joe DeRita (1946–1948) - 4 two-reelers
 Laughing with Medbury (1931–1935) - John P. Medbury hosted travelogues (27 total)
 Johnny Downs  (1942) - 2 two-reelers
 Johnny Walker International Forum (1941) – 3 two-reelers
 Lambs Club (1933) - 8 comedies showcasing members
 Leon Errol (1933–1934) - 5 comedy two-reelers
 Life's Last Laughs (1934–1935) - 6 one-reel spoofs on epitaphs
 Max Baer and Maxie Rosenbloom (1950–1952) - 4 two-reelers
 Monkeyshines (1931) - 5 comedies with an ape cast
 Monty Collins and Tom Kennedy (1935–1938) - 10 two-reelers, plus one with Monty solo (1936). Tom also co-starred with Johnny Arthur in one 1938 two-reeler.
 Music Hall Vanities (1939) - trio of shorts
 Music to Remember (1950) - 6 classical musical performances
 Musical Travelark (1954–1967) - 34 travelogues initially in CinemaScope and all in color. Harry Foster directed several.
 New York Parade (film series) (1940) - pair of documentaries (1940)
 Panoramics (1940–1945) - 14 one-reel documentaries
 Polly Moran (1936–1937) - 2 two-reelers
 Quiz Reel (film series) (1941–1942) - 5 one-reelers
 The Radio Rogues (1935) - 3 two-reelers
 Rambling Reporter travelogue (1930–1931) - 13 one-reelers
 Roscoe Karns (1941) - 2 two-reelers
 Screen Snapshots (C-B-C company: 1920–1924; Columbia: 1924–1958) - series of shorts that looked at the lives of various Hollywood stars
 Shemp Howard (1944–1947) - 9 two-reelers
 Slim Summerville (1943–1944) - 2 two-reelers
 Smith and Dale (1938–1939) - 2 two-reelers
 Special Happy Hour (1937–1939) - 7 one-reelers
 Spice of Life - Literary Digest Jokes (1934–1935) - 7 one-reelers
 Stars of Tomorrow (1935) - 6 one-reelers
 Sterling Holloway (1946–1948) - 6 two-reelers
 Strange as It Seems (1936–1937) - 8 drama/documentary two-reelers produced by the Screen Classics Studio
 Take It or Leave It (1940–1941) - produced by Ben K. Blake
 The Three Stooges (1934–1958) - 190 two-reelers
 Thrills of Music (1946–1949) - 23 big band musicals
 Una Merkel (1943–1944) - 2 two-reelers
 Vera Vague (1943–1952) - 16 two-reelers
 Victor Gems (1929–1930) - 31 short musicals
 Victory Shorts (1942–1944), some by the Office of War Information
 Voice of Experience (1935–1936) - 10 one-reel advice shorts produced by Rex Film and Ben K. Blake
 Wally Vernon and Eddie Quillan (1948–1956) - 16 two-reelers
 Walter Catlett (1934–1940) - 6 comedy two-reelers produced sporadically
 Walter Futter Curiosities (1930–1932) - 28 one-reel documentaries
 The Washington Parade (1938–1941) - 12 one-reelers profiling the capital
 World in Color travelogues (1937–1938) - 5 made in Cinecolor
 World of Sports (1932–1967) – 263+ one-reelers produced by John Randolph Bray in the early years and directed by Jack Kofoed until 1939, when Harry Foster took over. Most were in black and white prior to the sixties.
 Columbia also distributed many independent productions, including many imports from the National Film Board of Canada and the award-winning People Soup and Norman Rockwell's World... An American Dream.
 The Learning Corporation of America was mostly owned by Columbia between 1968 and 1975 (although the company continued through the early '90s), being responsible for many short educational films for schools (often 16mm), along with TV specials and theatrical shorts like the award-winning Angel and Big Joe (1975).

Educational Pictures

(Distributed through Fox Film and 20th Century Fox, 1932–1938)
 Al Christie Comedies (many two-reelers from 1922–1927)- Paramount took over distribution in 1927
 Andy Clyde Comedies (1932–1934)
 As A Dog Thinks (1933) – canine novelties by Robert C. Bruce
 Baby Burlesks (1932–1933) – juvenile comedies featuring Shirley Temple
 Battle for Life (1932–1934) – nature documentaries made by Horace & Stacy Woodard, including award winning City of Wax
 Bill Cunningham Sports Review (1931–1932)
 Cameo Comedies (1922–1932) – one-reelers with Jimmie Adams, Virginia Vance, Cliff Bowes, Eddie Barry, Sidney Smith, Phil Dunman, George Davis, Monte Collins, Jack Lloyd, Wallace Lupino, Gene Stone, William Dale and others. Sound added 1929.
 Campbell Comedies (1921–1922) – two-reelers
 Cannibals of the Deep (1931–1932) - Mack Sennett produced fishing reels
 Charles Bowers Comedies (1927–1928) – trick comedies (some with stop-motion animation)
 C. L. Chester “Chester-Outings” and “Chester Screenics” (1919–1921) – travelogues, also comedies with a chimpanzee Snooky
 Clyde Cook Comedies (1924) – two-reel
 Col. Stoopnagle’s Cavalcade Of Stuff (1938) – pair of spoof documentaries with Stoopnagle and Budd
 Coronet Comedies (1929–1936) – assorted two-reelers, earliest with Edward Everett Horton, later with Charles Judels, Buster West, Tom Howard, Tom Patricola, Vince Barnett & Billy Gilbert. Produced in last years by Al Christie.
 Dorothy Devore Comedies (1927–1929) – two-reelers
 Educational Musical Comedies (1934–1938) – two-reelers featuring Niela Goodelle, Harry Gribbon and early appearances by Bob Hope, The Ritz Brothers, Imogene Coca, Danny Kaye and June Allyson. Al Christie produced many of these.
 Frolics of Youth (1933–1935) – two-reel comedies with Frank Coghlin Jr. and others
 Gags & Gals (1936–1938) – two-reel cartoonist comedies produced by Al Christie with Jefferson Machamer
 Gayety Comedies (1930–1931) with Johnny Hines and Ford Sterling. Produced by Al Christie.
 Harry Langdon Comedies (1932–1933) – two-reelers
 Helena Smith Dayton (1917) – made a claymation short, co-produced by the SS Film Company
 Hodge Podge (film series) (1922–1933, sound added after 1929) – part-live-action travelogue, part animated cartoon (including claymation), initially utilizing footage collected by Lyman H. Howe
 Hollywood Girls Comedies (1930–1932) – two-reelers, some directed by Fatty Arbuckle
 Hollywood on Parade (1934) – pair of Louis Lewyn produced documentaries. Paramount also produced these.
 Hope Hampton Technicolor Specials (1925–1927) - fashion reels
 Ideal Comedies (1927–1929, with sound: 1930–1932) – two reelers with Clem Beauchamp, Al St. John & others
 Jack White Talking Comedies (1929–1930, 1933) – two-reelers. Milton Berle appeared in one of the last.
 James A. Fitzpatrick Sing-alongs (1926) - with Peggy Shaw
 Joe Rock Special: Krakatoa (1933)
 Johnny Walker Novelties (1932) – one-reel series “Great Hokum Mystery” and “Do You Remember?”
 Juvenile Comedies (1922–1929) – two-reelers with Malcolm Sebastian appearing in later ones dubbed Big Boy-Juvenile
 Larry Semon Comedies co-produced by Chadwick (1924–1927)
 Leon Britol Special: War In China (1932)
 Living Book of Nature (1917) – animal reels
 Lloyd Hamilton Comedies (1923-1929, with sound 1929–1931) – two-reelers
 Lupino Lane Comedies (1925–1929, sound added to last batch) – two-reelers
 Mack Sennett Sound Comedies (1928–1932) with Andy Clyde, Johnny Burke, Marjorie Beebe, Daphne Pollard, Billy Bevan, Harry Gribbon, Dorothy Granger, and Bing Crosby Musicals (1931–1932). A few in Naturalcolor
 Marriage Wows (1934) – two-reelers produced by Al Christie
 Mermaid Comedies (1920–1929; sound: 1929–1934) – two-reelers with Lloyd Hamilton (before starting his own series), Jimmie Adams, Lige Conley, Louise Fazenda, Sidney Smith, Virginia Vance, Al St. John, George Davis, Clem Beauchamp, Phil Dunham and Monte Collins. Sound comedies featured Franklin Pangborn, Eddie Lambert, Tom Howard, and Harry Langdon.
 Mirthquake Comedies (1935–1937) – two-reelers with Tom Howard, Tim Ryan & Irene Ryan Produced by Al Christie
 Moran and Mack Comedies (1933) – two-reelers
 Operalogue (1932–1933) – two-reel musicals
 “Our World Today” Kinograms (1928–1929)
 Pat Dowling’s “Camera Adventures” (1932–1933) – nature reels
 Robert C. Bruce Series (documentary shorts): Scenics (1920–1922, 1926–1927), Wilderness Tales (1922–1924) & Outdoor Sketches (1927–1928)
 Romance Productions (1926) – in color
 Romantic Journey (1931–1934) - Howard Brown and Curtis Nagel produced travelogues in Multicolor
 Screen Star Comedies / Star Personality Comedies / Top-Notch Comedies (1933–1937) were “umbrella” titles for two reelers featuring Bert Lahr, Buster Keaton, Joe Cook, Buster West, Charles Kemper, Tim Herbert, Pat Rooney Jr., Willie Howard and Ernest Truex. Many produced by Al Christie
 Sisters of the Skillet (1936–1937) - two-reelers produced by Al Christie
 Song & Comedy Hits (1935–1938) – one-reel musicals produced by Al Christie
 Song Hit Story (1932–1935) – one-reel musicals
 Spirit of the Campus (1932–1933) – one-reel musicals produced by Larry Kent
 Stereoscopiks (3D films, 1922–1925) - produced by Frederic Eugene Ives & Jacob Leventhal
 Tom Howard Comedies (1932–1933) – two-reel
 Toonerville Trolley (1921–1922) - live-action comedies. (Not to be confused with the animated version produced later by Amadee J. Van Beuren.)
 Torchy Series (1921–1922, 1931–1933) – silent comedies with Johnny Hines and two-reel comedies with sound with Ray Cook, Edmund Breese, Franklin Pangborn and others.
 Treasure Chest (1933–1938) – documentaries and musical shorts, mostly one-reel
 Tuxedo Comedies (1923–1929; with sound: 1929–1931, 1935–1936)  – two reelers with Ned Spears, Al St. John, Poodles Hanneford, Johnny Arthur, Wallace Lupino, Raymond McKee, Lloyd Hamilton, Tim Ryan, Irene Ryan, Buster West and Tom Patricola
 Vanity Comedies (1930–1932) – two-reelers with Bobby Vernon, Buster West, Vernon Dent, Billy Bevan and others
 Walter Futter’s Curiosities (1926–1928) - documentary novelties
 William J. Burns Detective (1930–1931) – one-reel dramas
 World Wanderings (1921–1922) – travelogues
 Young Romance Comedies (1935–1936) - two-reelers produced by Al Christie
 Zit’s Comedy (1923)

First National

 Buster Keaton (1921–1923)
 Charlie Chaplin (1918–1923)
 Mack Sennett Comedies (1918, 1921–1922) – featuring Ben Turpin, Marie Prevost, Billy Bevan, Louise Fazenda & others
 Toonerville Trolley (1920–1921) with Dan Mason

Fox Film and 20th Century Fox

 Academy of Motion Pictures Arts & Sciences (1949–1950) – 2 one-reelers in black and white.
 Adventures of the Newsreel Cameraman (1933–1942) – documentary series
 Al St. John Comedies (two-reel, silent 1921–1924)
 America Speaks (1942–1943) – wartime shorts. In addition, there were Office of War Information specials and imports from the Ministry of Information (United Kingdom).
 Arthur Houseman Comedies (two-reel, silent 1926–1927)
 Charles "Chic" Sale Comedies (silent & sound: 1927–1928)
 Clark and McCullough Comedies (sound: 1928–1929)
 CinemaScope Movietone Adventures / CinemaScope Specials (1953–1964) - initially 112 shorts produced, starting with orchestra performances by Alfred Newman (composer) and the coronation of Queen Elizabeth II, but later mostly travelogues. Two sub-series were often packaged under the same heading: “Movietone Assignment” (12 released 1957–1961) and Movietone’s "Amazing, But True" (3 made in 1962).
 Fashion Forecast (1938–1940) – 8 Technicolor shorts
 Father Hubbard Adventures with Bernard Rosecrans Hubbard (1933 special, 1939–1945) – 13 travelogues filmed in Alaska mostly, both black and white and later Cinecolor
 Fox Animal Comedies (two reel, silent 1926–1928) featuring many apes, kangaroos, lions… and humans.
 Fox Varieties (one-reel, silent 1923–1928) – travelogue series
 Fox Movietone Acts (all sound: 1928–1929) include a couple featurette three-reelers like John Ford’s Napoleon's Barber (1928) but mostly one-reelers with Raymond McKee, Mark Sandrich, Will Mahoney, Hugh Herbert, Joe Cook, Lionel Atwell, Robert Benchley, Allan Lane, and a series of musical acts often directed by Marcel Silver
  Grandeur Special (1930) - covers Niagara Falls in both sound and wide-screen
 Hallam Cooley Comedies (silent 1925–1926) - two-reelers
 Immortals of the Canvas (1952) – famous paintings in Technicolor (7 shorts, including Light in the Window: The Art of Vermeer)
 Imperial Comedy (two-reel, silent 1923–1928) featured Nick Stuart, Eddie Clayton, Gene Camero, Marjorie Beebe, Richard Walling and others
 Lew Lehr “Kindergarten” & “Dribble Puss Parade” (1938–1948) - 22 shorts, 2 in color
 Lupino Lane Comedies (two-reel, silent 1922)
 Magic Carpet of Fox Movietone (1931–1944) – the first travelogue series to use on-location sound, although narration was also used at times. Shot in either Cinecolor and Technicolor after 1939. Also known as “Along the Royal Road to Romance on the Magic Carpet” (1934–1938 period).
 The March of Time (distributed from 1942–1951, re-issued until in 1963)
 Movie Tintype (1933–1934) – silent film compilations
 Movietone Adventure (1943–1950,1960–1964) – 67 travelogues, many (but not all) in Technicolor. Second set in Cinemascope Deluxe Color.
 Movietone Melodies (1949–1950) – five big band reels in black & white. Later added a special Movietone Musical in color featuring Tommy Dorsey (1961)
 Movietone News (1927–1963) – first newsreel with sound, along with 20+ Specials (1931–1955), “See It Now” (9 newsreel compilations 1953–1955) and 8 “Timely Topics” specials (1959–1964)
 Movietone Sports Review / Movietone Sports Show (1938–1956, 1959–1963) – 102 shorts (24 in Technicolor) initially. Revived in CinemaScope in 1959 (20 total)
 Mutt and Jeff (1913–13) - live-action series
 O. Henry Featurettes (two-reel, silent 1925–1927)
 Our Land and People (1947) – 8 travelogue shorts in black and white
 Slim Summerville Unreel News (one-reel, silent 1923–1924)
 Sunshine Comedies (two-reel, silent 1916–1925) featured Jimmie Adams, Billie Ritchie, Jack Cooper, Harry Gribbon, Harry Sweet, Hank Mann, Jane Lee, Katherine Lee, Glen Cavender, Slim Summerville, Clyde Cook, Edgar Kennedy, Sidney Smith, Lee Moran, Ruth Hiatt, Chester Conklin, Oliver Hardy and others
 Tom Mix Westerns (two & three-reel, silent 1917–1918, 1922)
 20th Century Fox “specials” include Technicolor The Coronation of King George IV And Queen Elizabeth (1937), Ripley’s Believe It Or Not short Acquitted By The Sea (1940), plus a dozen more between 1944–1958, including Why Korea? (1950), Holy Pilgrimage (1950) and The Word (1953, featuring Dr Frank C. Laubach in New Guinea).
 Van Bibber Comedies (two-reel, silent 1924–1928) featured Earle Foxe, Florence Gilbert and Tyler Brooke
 The World Of Fashion: Yesterday, Today And Tomorrow (1968) - featurette
 The World Today (1941–1949) – 20 documentaries, followed by a trio focused on women’s issues called “Feminine World”

Hal Roach

(Distributed by Pathé Exchange, 1914–1928, and MGM, 1927–1938)
 All-Star Comedies (1925–1927) featuring Charles Murray, Lucien Littlefield, Theda Bara, Stan Laurel, Tyler Brooke, Lillian Roth and others
 Anita Garvin and Marion Byron (1928–1929) - 3 two-reelers
 The Boy Friends (1930–1932) - 15 shorts starring Mickey Daniels, Grady Sutton, David Sharpe, and Mary Kornman
 Edgar Kennedy (1929) - 3 two-reelers
 Harry Langdon (1929–1930) - 8 two-reelers
 James Finlayson (1925) - 6 two-reelers
 The Taxi Boys (1932–1933) - 10 two-reelers, mostly with Billy Gilbert and Ben Blue
 All-Star Specials (1933–1935) featuring Billy Gilbert, Eddie Foy Jr., Douglas Wakefield, Billy Nelson, Phyllis Barry and others
 The Schmaltz Brothers (1933–1934) - 3 two-reelers starring Billy Gilbert and Billy Bletcher
 Arthur Stone (1924–1925) - 12 two-reelers
 Beatrice La Plante (1920) - 5 one-reelers
 Charley Chase (1924–1936, sound after 1929) - 108 shorts, ranging from one to three reels
 Clyde Cooke (1924–1926) - 8 two-reelers
 Dippy Dood-Dads (1923–1924) – 14 one-reelers featuring monkeys and dogs
 Eddie Boland (19211922, 1925) - 13 one-reelers
 Fite / Hunky Dory (1923–1925) - 9 one-reelers featuring Earl Mohan & Billy Engle
 Gaylord Lloyd (1921) - 5 one-reelers
 "Crosseyed Slim" (George Rowe) (1922) - 1 one-reeler
 George Whiting Series (1915)
 Glenn Tryon (1924–1925) - 21 two-reelers and 2 features
 Harold Lloyd (1915–1921) - 177 shorts, ranging from one to three reels. Originally headed the "Willie Work" series in 1915, then the "Lonesome Luke" series through 1917, later moving into feature films until 1923
 Irvin S. Cobb (1934) - 4 two-reelers
 Laurel and Hardy (1927–1935) - 62 shorts ranging from two to four reels. Originally part of the "All-Star" series. The most famous comedy team mostly appeared in short films initially, but also made 13 features for Hal Roach from 1931 to 1940.
 Mabel Normand (1926) - 5 three-reelers
 Max Davidson (1926–1927) - 17 two-reelers
 Our Gang (1922–1938) - 168 comedy shorts and one feature film produced. Hal Roach later sold the series to MGM, which continued filming new titles with the cast through 1943.
 “Paul” James Parrott (1921–1923) - 67 one-reelers
 Skinny (Dee Lampton) (1916–1917) - 9 shorts ranging from five to ten minutes
 Snub Pollard (1918–1926) - 135 shorts ranging from one to two reels
 Stan Laurel (solo) (1918–1919, 1923–1924) - 30 shorts ranging from one to two reels
 Sunshine Sammy (1921) - 1 two-reeler
 The Spat Family (1923–1925) – 24 two-reelers starring Frank Butler, Sidney D'Albrook & Laura Roessing
 Toto (1917–1918) – 16 shorts ranging from one to two reels. Featuring Arnold Novello
 Vanity Fair Girls (1920–1921) – 14 one-reelers. Featuring Eddie Boland
 Will Rogers (1922–1924) - 14 two-reelers
 ZaSu Pitts and Thelma Todd (1931–1933) - 16 shorts ranging from two to three reels
 Thelma Todd and Patsy Kelly (1933–1936) - 21 two-reelers
 Patsy Kelly and Pert Kelton (1936) - 1 two-reeler
 Patsy Kelly and Lyda Roberti (1936) - 2 two-reelers and one feature

Mack Sennett

 (for Keystone Studios-Mutual Film Corporation: 1912–1915) – featuring Marie Dressler, Mabel Normand, Roscoe Arbuckle, Ford Sterling, Al St. John, Mack Swain, Chester Conklin and others. (Several featured in the Keystone Kops). Charlie Chaplin started with Sennett in 1913, later heading his own series for Essanay Studios in 1914–1915 and Mutual Film Corporation in 1916–1917.
 (for Keystone Studios-Triangle Film Corporation: 1915–1918) – Chester Conklin, Mabel Normand, Roscoe Arbuckle, Raymond Hitchcock, Polly Moran, Mae Busch, Syd Chaplin, Louise Fazenda, Ben Turpin, Gloria Swanson, Billy Bevan, Charlie Murray, Hank Mann, Harry Gribbon and others
 (for Keystone Studios-Pathé Exchange, 1918)
 (for Paramount: 1917–1921) - featuring Ben Turpin, Gloria Swanson, Mack Swain, Chester Conklin, Louise Fazenda, Slim Summerville, Cliff Bowes, Harry Gribbon, Eddie Gribbon, Billy Armstrong, Billy Bevan, Charlie Murray, Marie Prevost, Bert Roach, Ford Sterling and others.
 (for First National: 1918, 1921–1922) – featuring Ben Turpin, Marie Prevost, Billy Bevan, Louise Fazenda & others
 (for Pathé Exchange)
 Alice Day (1925–1927)
 All-Star Comedies (1923–1928) –featuring Harry Gribbon, Mildred June, Sidney Smith, Jack Cooper, Eddie Quinlin, Ruth Taylor, Andy Clyde, Madeline Hurlock, Irving Bacon, Oliver Hardy and others
 Ben Turpin (1923–1927)
 Billy Bevan (1923–1928, sound with final titles)
 Campus Comedies (1928) – featuring Daphne Pollard and Carole Lombard
 Harry Langdon (1924–1926)
 Ralph Graves (1924–1926)
 The Smiths (1926–1928) – featuring Raymond McKee, Ruth Hiatt and Mary Ann Jackson
 (sound comedies for Educational Pictures: 1928–1932) with Andy Clyde, Johnny Burke, Marjorie Beebe, Daphne Pollard, Billy Bevan, Harry Gribbon, Dorothy Granger, and Bing Crosby Musicals (1931–1932). Documentary series: “Cannibals of the Deep”
 (sound comedies for Paramount: 1932–1933) - featuring Franklin Pangborn, Mack Swain, Ben Turpin, Marjorie Beebe, Lloyd Hamilton, Daphne Pollard, Donald Novis, Charlie Murray, Eddie Gribbon, Billy Gilbert, Walter Catlett and W. C. Fields

Metro Pictures

 Buster Keaton (1920–1921)
 Bull Montana (1922–1923)
 Mr. and Mrs. Sidney Drew (1916–1919)
 Rolma Films (1916–1918) with a variety of stars like Mack Swain and Billy Quirk
 Screen Classics series (1920)
 Stan Laurel Comedies (1922–1923)

Metro-Goldwyn-Mayer

 Academy of Motion Pictures Arts & Sciences (1950) – 3 one-reelers in black and white
 Around the World with Burton Holmes (1930–1931) – 12 one-reel travelogues
 CinemaScope Specials (1953–1956) – approximately 8, early ones were orchestra performances led by Johnny Green. Also The Battle of Gettysburg (1955 film)
 Colortone Musical (1929–1935) - 17 one and two reel musicals in Technicolor, utilizing the full rainbow process from mid-1934.
 Colortone Revue (1929–1930) – 5 black and white (but sepia tone released) comedies, two with Jack Benny.
 Crime Does Not Pay (1935–1946) - 49 two-reel dramatic shorts
 Dogville Comedies (1929–1931) - nine short parodies of feature films enacted by dogs, also known as All-Barkies.
 FitzPatrick Traveltalks (1931–1953) – travelogues initially released independently in the late twenties, but approximately 221 one-reelers for MGM. In full Technicolor starting in 1934.
 Hal Roach Comedies (distributed between 1927 and 1938)
 Herbert Kalmus Great Events (silent, 1927–1929) – 12 two-reelers produced in 2-color Technicolor, costumed recreations of famous events from Betsy Ross to Cleopatra.
 Historical Mysteries (1937–1938) – 11 one reel docu-shorts narrated by Carey Wilson and John Nesbitt
 Louis Lewyn Galaxy of Stars (1934–1937) – 7 Technicolor two-reelers  featuring many familiar faces. Also a few “MGM Miniatures” in black & white later followed the same model.
 MGM Movietone Acts (1928–1930) - 82 one-reelers spotlighting various comedy and musical acts in sound
 MGM Oddities / MGM Miniatures (1-reel, 1932–1946, 1951–1955) – about 115+ documentaries and comedy shorts running less than 11 minutes in length. Term “Oddity” replaced by “Miniature” by 1935. Early “Oddities” narrated by Pete Smith (two in color) and later Carey Wilson. Charles "Chic" Sale appeared in some mid-thirties entries. Also a series profiling Nostradamus.
 MGM Musical Revue (1933–1934) – 9 two-reelers  including some Three Stooges in early Technicolor
 MGM 2-Reel Special (1927–1929, 1931, 1933–1945) - includes a documentary 24 Dollar Island directed by Robert Flaherty, also Jackie Cooper special (1931), followed by a more consistently released series starting in 1935, often musicals.
 Martin Block Musical Merry-Go-Round (1947–1948) – 6 total
 Office of War Information & War Activities Committee Specials (1941–1943)
 Our Gang (1938–1944) 52 shorts; taken over from Hal Roach.
 The Passing Parade (1938–1949) - 73 strange-but-true stories narrated by John Nesbitt.
 Pete Smith series (1931–1955)
 Fisherman's Paradise (6 sports-reels, 1 in early Technicolor, 1931–1932)
 Sports Champions / Sports Parade (36 one-reelers, 1931–1936)
 Goofy Movies (10 one-reel spoofs edited from various silent film clips, 1933–1934)
 3D film Specials (3 made in 1935, ’37 & ’40)
 Specialties (214 live-action documentary/comedies 1935–1955, at least 18 in color. Dave O'Brien appeared in many ‘40s and ‘50s comedy titles)
 Robert Benchley Comedies (1935–1940; 1943–1944) – 30 one reelers
 Romance of Celluloid (1937–1944) – behind the scenes documentaries
 Spotlight on the World We Live In (1951) – newsreel series made by Gordon Films
 Stop Look and Listen (film) (1967)
 Tabloid Musical (1936–1937) – 7 one-reelers, including the famous Every Sunday
 Theater of Life (1946–1948) – 4 two-reel documentaries co-produced by the Associated Press
 UFA “Oddity” (1927–1929) – 43 imported from Germany silent documentaries

Paramount

 Al Christie Comedies (two-reel, silent 1927–1929, sound 1929–1930) featuring Edward Everett Horton, Bill Dooley, Bobby Vernon, Neal Burns, Jack Duffy, Jimmie Adams, Billy Engle, Harold Conklin, Ann Cornwall, Madge Kennedy, Andy Clyde, Frances Lee, Jason Robards Sr., Spencer Williams, Louise Fazenda, Johnny Arthur, Dot Farley, Buster West, Taylor Holmes, Lois Wilson and others.
 Al St. John Comedies (two-reel, silent 1920)
 Bing Crosby (1932–1934)- musical two-reelers produced by Mack Sennett and later Arvid E. Gillstrom
 Broadway Highlights (1935–1936)
 Burton Holmes Travel Pictures (1914–1922)
 Carter DeHaven Comedies (1919–1920)
 Color Cruises (1936–1939) one-reel travelogues in Cinecolor, produced by Palmer Miller and Curtis Nagel
 Comique Comedies (1917–1920) featuring Fatty Arbuckle and Buster Keaton
 Days of Real Sport by Briggs (1919) directed by John William Kelette
 Frederick Burlingham Adventures / Travel Pictures (1919–1920) - travelogues
 Fredrick Feher Symphonic Series (1938–1939)
 Grantland Rice “Sports Eye-View” and “Sportlights” (1932–1956)
 Hedda Hopper’s Hollywood (1941–1942)
 Here’s Homer (1967–1968) - Homer Groening produced comedies
 High Topper Special (1961–1965) - umbrella title for assorted documentary shorts
 Hollywood on Parade (1932–1934), produced by Louis Lewyn
 James A. Fitzpatrick Melody Masters (1929)
 James Montgomery Flagg Comedies (1918–1919)
 Leslie Winik sports-reels (1960–1968), sometimes co-produced with Sports Illustrated
 Mack Sennett Comedies (distributed by Paramount: 1917–1921) Featuring Ben Turpin, Gloria Swanson, Mack Swain, Chester Conklin, Louise Fazenda, Slim Summerville, Cliff Bowes, Harry Gribbon, Eddie Gribbon, Billy Armstrong, Billy Bevan, Charlie Murray, Marie Prevost, Bert Roach, Ford Sterling and others.
 Mack Sennett Sound Comedies (1932–1933) featuring Franklin Pangborn, Mack Swain, Ben Turpin, Marjorie Beebe, Lloyd Hamilton, Daphne Pollard, Donald Novis, Charlie Murray, Eddie Gribbon, Billy Gilbert, Walter Catlett and W. C. Fields
 Mr. and Mrs. Sidney Drew VBK Comedies (two-reel, silent 1918–1919)
 Musical Romance (1935–1937) - musical specials
 Pacemaker (film series) (1946–1955) one-reel comedies and documentaries
 Paramount Varieties (later renamed “Paragraphics”) (1934–1943) – one reel documentaries
 Paramount Headliners (1933–1943, 1946) - jazz and big band reels directed mostly by Fred Waller and Leslie Roush
 Paramount News (1927, sound added ’29, through 1957), in addition to specials
 Paramount One Reel Acts (1928–1933) shot at the Astoria facilities in New York and featuring Ruth Etting, Fanny Brice, Rudy Vallée, Eddie Cantor, Donald Ogden Stewart, Smith & Dale, Fred Allen, Lillian Roth, Tom Howard, after 1930: George Burns, Gracie Allen, Ethel Merman, Jack Benny, Solly Ward, Lulu McConnell, Havana Casino Orchestra, Eugene Howard, Marion Harris, George Dewey Washington, Louis Armstrong, Boswell Sisters, Cary Grant (one short), Vincent Lopez and many others who also appeared in Vitaphone shorts for Warner Brothers during the same period.
 Paramount Pictographs (later “Paramount Magazine”) (1916–1921) – featured live-action travelogue and human interest subject matter, with animated cartoon segments produced by either John Randolph Bray or Pat Sullivan.
 Paramount Pictorials (1930–1939) – one-reel documentaries with three or four separate topics resembling a newsreel. Sometimes these included scenes in Technicolor
 Paramount Specials (silent era) included such titles as Truckee, California Stages The First Sweepstake Dog Race Outside Of Alaska (1915), 100% American (1918), Oh Judge! How Could You?  (1919), Night of the Dub (1919) and a pair of studio promotionals (1922 & 1927).
 Paramount Specials (sound era) (1932–1951) – at least nine were made, including Hollywood Extra Girl with Cecil B. DeMille and The Fashion Side of Hollywood with Josef von Sternberg.
 Paramount Travel Adventures (or “Paramount Treasury of Travels”) (1964–1968)
 Paramount Two Reel Acts (1928–1933) shot at the Astoria facilities in New York and featuring Helen Hayes, Humphrey Bogart (one film), Walter Houston, Lorenz Hart, Richard Rodgers, Tom Howard, Billy House, after 1930: George Jessel, Victor Moore, Jack Benny, Karl Dane, George K. Arthur, Al St. John, Ford Sterling and others.
 Phil L. Ryan Comedies featuring Chester Conklin (1930–1931), Walter Catlett, Eugene Pallette, Harry Langdon, and Leon Errol (all 1933–1934)
 Popular Science (1935–1949) – color science and technology newsreels produced by Jerry Fairbanks and Robert Carlisle
 Post Nature Picture (1918–1920) credited to W.A. Van Scoy
 Quiz Kids (1941–1942) – Cinecolor educational one-reelers hosted by Joe Kelly
 Robert Benchley Comedies (1940–1942)
 Robert C. Bruce Scenics (1929–1931)
 Screen Souvenirs (1932–1936)
 Son of Democracy (1917–1918), credited to Benjamin Chapin
 Speaking of Animals (1941–1949) – animal comedies (live-action, but often with animated mouths) produced by Jerry Fairbanks
 The Star Reporter (1936–1938) – four behind-the-scenes specials
 Technicolor Musical Parade (1943–1948) – all two-reels
 Topper Special (1951–1956) – one-reel documentaries
 Unusual Occupations (1937–1949) color documentaries from Jerry Fairbanks
 Victor Moore Comedies (two-reel, silent 1916–1917)
 Victory Shorts – wartime documentaries (1942–1944) under War Activities Committee of the Motion Pictures Industry
 VistaVision Specials (1954–1957) includes Williamsburg: the Story of a Patriot and travelogue “VistaVision Visits”, sometimes produced by James A. Fitzpatrick
 Wild Men of Africa (1921): four films edited from a featurette of Leonard J. Vandenbergh

Pathé Exchange

Company merged with RKO in 1931.

 Adventures of Bill & Bob (1920–1922)
 Benny Rubin Comedies (1930–1931)
 Chronicles of America (1923–1924)
 Edgar Jones Westerns (1921)
 Fred H. Kiser Industrial Films (1922–1923)
 Grantland Rice's Sportlight (1923–1933) and “Football Sense” (1927)
 Hal Roach comedies (distributor, 1914–1927)
 Harvard University Department of Geology (1928–1929)
 Henry & Polly (1927) with Leah Baird and Taylor Holmes
 Hugh Wiley’s Wildcat (1929–1930) with Ford Washington Lee and John William Sublett
 Indian Frontier (1924) with Ed Brady
 James A. Fitzpatrick Famous Melodies (1926)
 Johnny Jones (1922) featuring Edward Peil Jr.
 Knute Rockne sports-reels (1930)
 Mack Sennett comedies (distributor, 1923–1929)
 Major Allen’s Safari (1921)
 Monty Banks shorts and features (1927–1930)
 On Guard with Arch Heath (1927)
 Pathé Novelty (1922–1928) – umbrella title for assorted documentaries and specials
 Pathé Review (silent version, 1919–1930, sound version called “Pathé Audio Review”, 1929–1933) - multi-subject shorts made on an average of 52 per year, usually with one or two segments in color (often stenciled).
 Pathé Sound Comedies (1929–1932) known by different sub-titles: Campus Comedies, Capitol Comedies, Checker Comedies, E. B. Derr Comedies, Follies, George Le Maire Comedies, Golden Roosters, Manhattan Comedies, Melody Comedies, Rainbow Comedies, Rodeo Comedies, Rufftown Comedies, Smitty & His Pals, Variety Comedies and Whoopee Comedies. These featured Nat Carr, Daphne Pollard, Edgar Kennedy, James Gleason, William Frawley, Harry Watson Jr., Reginald Merville, Franklyn Pangborn and Dot Farley
 Range Rider Westerns (1922–1923) starring Leo D. Maloney
 Rarebits (1927–1928) produced by Record Pictures
 Raymond L. Ditmars Nature Reels (1912–1915). He also made segments for the Pathé Review.
 Smitty & His Pals (1928–29) - 2 reel comedies produced by Amadee J. Van Beuren
 Song Sketches (1930) directed by Oscar Lund and produced by Amadee J. Van Beuren
 Sound Topics of the Day (1929–1930) directed by Alfred T. Mannon and produced by Amadee J. Van Beuren
 Stereoscopiks (1925) – 3D film experiments produced by Frederic Eugene Ives and Jacob Leventhal
 Tom Santschi Westerns (1921)
 Topics of the Day (for Timely Prod., 1919–1929) produced by Amadee J. Van Beuren
 Travelesque (1927–1928) featuring Will Rogers
 True Detective Stories (1924)
 Vagabond Adventure (1930–1931, for RKO-Pathé: 1931–1937) - travelogues produced by Amadee J. Van Beuren
 Walter Futter Curiosities (1928–1929) produced by Amadee J. Van Beuren
 World Geography (1927–1928) produced by Duncan Underbill

Republic

 Land of Opportunity (1949–1950) – four documentaries
 Meet the Stars (1940–1941) – 11 one-reelers
 This World of Ours (1950–1955) – Carl Dudley produced Trucolor travelogues
 Trucolor Specials (1956)

RKO

(These do not include the Pathé shorts listed above)
 Academy of Motion Pictures Arts & Sciences – 3 shorts (1948–1950)
 Amadee J. Van Beuren productions for RKO-Pathé (post–1931):
 Dumb-Bell Letters (1934–1936)
 Easy Aces (1935–1936) featuring the popular radio duo Goodman Ace and Jane Ace
 Floyd Gibbons Supreme Thrills (1931)
 Golf with Johnny Farrell (1931)
 The Last Frontier (1932) – western series
 Liberty Short Story (1931) – courtroom dramas
 Magna Productions (1933–1934), featuring big name stars like Bert Lahr and Ethel Waters.
 Miniatures (1931)
 Sports with Bill Corum (1935–1937)
 Struggle To Live (1935–1937) – nature reels by Horace & Stacy Woodard
 True Detective Stories (1931–1932) with Walter Miller as Nick Harris.
 Vagabond Adventure / retitled “World on Parade” after 1935 (1930–1937) - travelogues
 The Blondes and the Redheads (1933–1935)
 Broadway Headliners (later simply “Headliners”) (1931–1938), musical-comedies with W. C. Fields, Clark and McCullough, Ruth Etting, Ted Fio Rito, Tom Kennedy, Gene Austin, Betty Grable, Jack Norton and Phil Harris.
 Charles "Chic" Sale (1931–1932)
 Clark and McCullough (1931–1935)
 Condor Musicals (1937) – 3 produced in New York
 Edgar Kennedy Comedies (a.k.a. “Mr. Average Man”) (1931–1948) (see also Pathé list above)
 Ely Culbertson My Bridge Experiences (1933)
 Famous Jury Trials (1942) – dramas directed by J. H. Lenauer
 Flicker Flashbacks (1943–1948) – silent film collections compiled by Richard Fleischer
 Four Star Comedies (1932–1935) with Tom Kennedy, Harry Gribbon, Harry Sweet, Walter Catlett and Chick Chandler.
 Frank McHugh Comedies (1931–1932)
 Gay Girl Comedies (1931–1932)
 Gil Lamb Comedies (1949–1952)
 Gramercy Series (1929–1930) – musical acts including Duke Ellington and Bessie Smith
 Pal (1946–1950) – dog dramas featuring Gary Gray
 Humanettes (1930–1931) – series of 12 shorts featuring vaudeville and music acts with human stars' heads atop doll bodies
 Information Please (1939–1942) – film adaptation of the radio series
 Larry Darmour and Standard Cinema provided F.B.O. and later RKO with 2-reel comedies:
 Barney Google (1928–1929)
 H.C. Witwer Record Breakers (1929–1930) featuring Albert Vaughn, Al Cook & George Gray
 Karl Dane and George K. Arthur Comedies (1930–1931)
 Louise Fazenda Comedies with Max Davidson in support (1930–1931)
 Mickey McGuire (1927–1933) starring Mickey Rooney
 Toots and Casper (1928–1929) with Thelma Hill & Bud Duncan
 Leon Errol Comedies (1934–1951)
 Major Bowes Theatre of the Air (1935–1936) with Edward Bowes made at Biograph Studios and adapted from Major Bowes Amateur Hour
 March of Time (distributor, 1935–1942)
 The Masquers Club (1931–1933)
 Ned Sparks (1931)
 The Newlyweds (RKO series) (1949–1952) with Robert Neil & Suzi Crandall
 Nick & Tony (1930–1931) with Nick Basil and Henry Armetta
 Nu-Atlas Musical (1937–1939) produced in New York by Milton Schwarzwald
 Pathé News (1931–1947)
 Pathé Audio Review (Pathé: 1929–1931, RKO-Pathé: 1931–1933) – see Pathé section for details
 Pathé Topics (1935–1937) – 18 newsreel specials
 Picture People (1940–1942) – behind-the-scenes Hollywood series
 Radio Flash (1935–1940) – assorted comedies featuring Jack Norton, Dot Farley, James Finlayson, Harry Langdon, among others.
 Radio Musical (1935–1939) – 10 two-reelers with Ruth Etting appearing in one.
 Ray Whitley & His Six-Bar Cowboys (1937–1942) – 18 two-reel musicals
 RCA Photophone and Radio Comedies (1929–1932) featuring Nat Carr, Marc Connelly, Jimmy Aubrey and others
 Reelism (1938–1940) – one-reel documentaries produced by Frederic Ullman Jr.
 RKO Jamboree (later renamed “Musical Featurettes”) (1942–43, 1946–48)
 RKO-Pathé Special (1933–1937, 1951–1957) – mostly documentary; second series replaced “This Is America”
 RKO Specials (assorted, 1930–1957) include a 65mm musical Campus Sweethearts (1930), a Robert Benchley Comedy (1934), A Trip Through Fijiland (1935), La Cucaracha (1934 film) and The Boy and the Eagle (1947) both in Technicolor, Conquer by the Clock (1942), The House I Live In (1945), the “Victory Specials” (1942–1943), “Theater Of Life” Specials (1952, 1956) and “Wildlife Album” specials (1955–1957)
 Roscoe Ates (1931)
 Screenliner (1948–1957) – one-reel documentary shorts
 The Smart Set (1935–1937) – comedies with Betty Grable, Jack Norton, Lucille Ball, Billy Gilbert, Tom Kennedy and Ford Sterling
 Sportscopes (1938–1957) – one-reel documentaries on sports
 Superba (1936–1937) – umbrella title for earliest Leon Errol series and two featuring Lew Kelly & Ruth Hiatt
 This Is America (RKO film series) (1942–1951) – two-reel documentaries inspired by March of Time. Replaced by a sporadic release of RKO-Pathé Specials.
 The Traveling Man (1931–1932), starring Louis John Bartels
 Wally Brown and Jack Kirkwood Comedies (1949–1951)
 Walt Disney (distributor of most shorts and features, 1937–1956)

United Artists

 David L. Loew Musicolor shorts (8 one reelers in Cinecolor, 1946–1948)
 W. Lee Wilder Songs of America (16 one-reelers, 1949–1950)
 William Cameron Menzies musical shorts (1929–1930)
 The World in Action (1941–1945) imported from National Film Board of Canada
 World Windows (1938) imported from UK and filmmaker Jack Cardiff
 various independent shorts released between 1954 and 1972

Universal

Sound films
 Academy of Motion Pictures Arts & Sciences one-reel special 1949
 America Speaks (1942–1943) – 3 one-reel documentaries
 Answer Man (1946–1948) – 15 one-reel documentaries
 Arthur Lake comedies (1928–1930), initially the silent “Horace in Hollywood” two-reel comedies
 Basketball Sports-reels (written by Albert H. Kelley and Samuel Freeman) (1931)
 Benny Rubin (1929) – approximately 7 sound one-reel comedies
 Charlie Murray & George Sidney Comedies (1930–1931) – 11 two-reelers
 Christy Walsh All-America Sportreel (1931–1932) – 15 sports-reels
 Daphne Pollard Comedies (1931–1932) – 4 two-reelers
 Earth and Its People (1947–1949) – 35 two-reel travelogues initially released to schools in 16mm format, theatrically in 35mm in 1952-53.
 Going Places (1934–1941) - 92 travelogues with Lowell Thomas and Graham McNamee (after ’38) narrating. Produced/directed by Allyn Butterfield and Charles E. Ford
 Junior Jewel Comedies (1929–1930) with Snappy and “The Sporting Youth”, including Ann Christy, Sumner Getchell & Joan McCoy
 Juvenile Jury (1946–1947) – 4 quiz novelty reels with Jack Barry (game show host)
 Laemmle Novelties (1928–1929) – first sound series with musical and stage performances. Vernon Dent and Lou Archer appeared together in one.
 Lloyd Hamilton Comedies (1931–1932) – 4 two-reelers
 Louis Sobol (1932–1934) – 4 one and two-reelers
 Mentone Brevity (1933–1939) – 77 variety shorts shot in New York City with many stage performers like Ethel Barrymore, Bill Robinson, Bob Hope, among others.
 Morton Downey in “America's Greatest Composers” (1932–1933) – trio of  shorts
 Name Band Musical (1939–1957) – 214 California filmed 15–20 minute shorts showcasing the best in jazz and big band
 Northwest Mounted Police (sound film series) (1929–1930) – two-reelers with Ted Carson
 Pat Rooney (1929) – 6 two-reel comedies
 Person-Oddity (1942–1946) – 48 human interest documentaries (one-reel) produced by Thomas Mead & Joseph O'Brien
 Pioneer Kid (1929–1930) – two-reel westerns with Bobby Nelson, some initially filmed silent with sound dubbed in.
 Red Star Comedy (1930–1932) – approximately 12 two-reelers with an assortment (including Edgar Kennedy, Tom O’Brian, Franklin Pangborn & Jack Duffy)
 Robert Benchley (1933) – one short “Your Technocracy And Mine”
 The Shadow (film series version) (1931–1932) – 6 two-reel fantasy-dramas adapted from the radio show with Arthur Aylesworth
 Sing & Be Happy (1945–1949) – 29 musical one-reelers
 Slim Summerville (1930–1934) – 20 two-reel comedies
 Strange as it Seems (1930–1934) – 39 newsreel oddity-reels much like Believe It Or Not produced by Jerry Fairbanks and Manny Nathan Hahn, adapted from John Hix comics and shown in Multicolor during the first two seasons.
 Stranger Than Fiction (1934–1942) – 110 documentary shorts, successor to Strange As It Seems covering animals, travel and peculiar items of interest. Production by Allyn Butterfield, Thomas Mead and Joseph O’Brien with Charles E. Ford and later Henry Clay Bate as key directors.
 Sunny Jim McKee (1929–1930) – two-reel juvenile comedies
 SuperSpecial Featurettes (1959–1968) – 23 running 20–30 minutes in color
 Syd Saylor Comedies (1930) – 5 two-reelers
 Thalians Club Comedies (1931–1932, 1934) – 5 two-reelers with Franklyn Pangborn and others.
 Universal Brevities & Novelties (1930–1934) – 16 documentary one-reelers
 Universal Color Adventures (1962–1972) – approximately 57 assorted one and two-reel documentaries
 Universal-International Color Parade (1952–1962) – approximately 72 one and two-reel documentaries.
 Universal-International Musical Westerns (1948–1949) - 19 two-reelers featuring Tex Williams and other country singers
 Universal Specials (1930–1958, 1969–1972) – 45 comedy and documentary two-reelers not part of any series, in color by the ‘50s.
 Universal Newsreel (1929–1967), also including a group of annual “Football Highlights” specials (1959–1967)
 Van Ronkel Comedies (1935) – 6 two-reelers mostly with Sterling Holloway
 Variety View (film series) (1941–1958) – 260 documentary one-reelers replacing “Going Places” and produced by Thomas Mead and initially Joseph O'Brien. All in black and white.
 Vernon Dent (1929–1930) – pair of comedies
 Victory Shorts (1942–1944) – 7 documentary one-reelers
 Vistarama Specials (1954–1957) – 9 widescreen Eastmancolor travelogues produced by Carl Dudley
 Warren Doane Comedies (1932–1935) – 46 two-reelers with James Gleason, Louise Fazenda, Sterling Holloway, Henry Armetta and others.
 William Rowland & Monty Brice Featurettes (1932–1933) - 6 two-reel musicals,  featuring such acts as Ruth Etting and the Boswell Sisters

Silent films (pre-1928)
 Arthur Lake “Drugstore Cowboy” Series (1927–1928) – two-reel westerns
 The Battling Cowboy (1924–1925)
 Ben Hall Comedies (1927–1928)
 Bert Roach Comedies (1923–1924)
 Bess the Detectress (1914)
 Big U (Universal) Productions (1914–1917) – both comedies and dramas
 Bison Film Company (1912–1917) co-produced with Universal
 Bluebird Comedy (1925–1927) – one-reelers featuring Neely Edwards, Charles Puffy, Arthur Lake and others. The Bluebird logo also handled occasional special shorts since 1916.
 Bob Curwood Westerns (1927–1928)
 Brunton Comedies (1922) co-produced with Universal
 Bull’s Eye Comedies (1924–1925) – one-reelers featuring Bert Roach, Neely Edwards & Alice Howell
 Century Studios Comedies (1917–1928), co-produced with Universal both one and two-reel comedies featuring Edith Roberts, Jimmie Adams, Alice Howell, the Century Lions (1918–1921), Joe Martin the chimpanzee (1919–1920), Brownie the Dog (1919–1923), Harry Sweet (after 1920), Baby Peggy (after 1921), Lee Moran (1922), Queenie (a horse), Maude (a mule), Buddy Messinger (1923), Pal (a dog, 1923) and Wanda Wiley (1924). The Stern Brothers took over and added other series: The Gumps (with Joe Murphy, Fay Tincher & Jack Morgan, 1923–1928), Buster Brown (with Arthur Trimble & Doreen Turner, 1925–1929), The Excuse Makers (with Wanda Wiley & Charles King, 1926–1927), What Happened To Jane? (1926–1927), Let George Do It (with Syd Saylor, 1926–1929), Newlyweds (with Syd Saylor, Ethlyne Clair, Jack Egan, Derelys Perdue & Sunny Jim McKee, 1926–1929), Keeping Up with the Joneses (1927–1928), Rube Goldberg Mike & Ike (1927–1929) and the assorted Stern Bros. Comedies (1925–1926).
 Champion Boy Rider (1927–1928) – two-reel westerns
 Champion Film Company (1912–1913)
 Charles Puffy Comedies (1928)
 The Collegians (1925–1929) – two-reel comedies made by the Junior Jewel division with George J. Lewis, Eddie Phillips and others. Soundtracks added to the later entries.
 Crystal Films (1912–1914) co-produced with Universal, featuring “Baldy” Joseph Belmont, Vivian Prescott and Pearl White
 Cyclone Smith (1919) – two-reel adventures with Eddie Polo
 Eclair (1912–1915) co-produced with Universal
 Famous Finlay Nature Pictures (1918) – documentaries featuring William L. Finley
 Fast Steppers (1924) – two-reelers
 The Forest Rangers (series) (1928–1929)
 Francis Ford Dramas (1913–1915)- mostly one-reel
 Gem Productions (1912–1913), co-produced with Universal one-reel comedies with Billy Quirk as well as mini-documentaries
 Gold Seal Productions (1913–1917) – ranging from one to three reels, including the “Lord John’s Journal” and “Under the Crescent” series
 Hoot Gibson Westerns (1917–1921, 1926)
 Hysterical History (1924–1925) – mostly one-reel spoofs on history with Slim Summerville, Billy Franey and others.
 IMP (1912–1917) was Universal’s initial flagship company with many comedies, dramas and documentaries, including the “Blinks” series with Charles DeForrest (1913) and some ambitious dramas starring King Baggot.
 Jack Dempsey “Fight & Win” (1924) – two reelers
 Jack London’s “Tales of the Fish Patrol” (1922–1923) – two-reel outdoor adventures with Jack Mulhall, Louise Lorraine and others
 Joker Film (1912–1917) co-produced with Universal many one-reel comedies with an assortment of big names: Grace Cunard, Louise Fazenda, Max Asher, Bobby Vernon, Billy Franey, Ernest Shields, Gale Henry and others. There were also travelogue and human interest documentary segments edited into split reels.
 L-KO Kompany (1914–1919) produced many Mack Sennett-influenced slapstick comedies through Universal distribution, some directed by Henry Lehrman. Stars included Raymond Griffith, Gertrude Selby, Billy Armstrong, Phil Dunham, Hank Mann, Alice Howell and Billie Ritchie.
 Laemmle Films (1915–1917) – various comedies and dramas
 The Leather Pushers (1921–1924) – sports drama two-reelers, with Billy Sullivan
 Mirror (Universal film series) (1922) was a 4-part series featured vintage newsreel footage like President McKinley
 Mustang (western shorts) (1925–1928) – two reel westerns with Edmund Cobb
 Nestor Studios (1912–1919) co-produced with Universal with its best comedies of the period with Eddie Lyons, Lee Moran and Billy Franey.
 Northwest Mounted Police (silent film series) (1927–1929) with Jack Perrin and Nelson McDowell
 Okeh Komedy (1919)
 Pat Powers Picture Plays (1912–1917) - both mini-dramas and documentaries. *Rainbow Film Productions (1920–1923)
 Red Feather Productions (1916)
 Rex Motion Picture (1912–1917) co-produced with Universal
 St. Louis Motion Picture (1913–1914) co-produced with Universal
 Slim Summerville & Bobby Dunn Comedies (1923–1925)
 Star Comedies (1917–1923) – including Hank Mann, Eddie Boland, Bartine Burkett, Austin Howard, Bert Roach, Cliff Bowes, Dorothea Wolbert, Eddie Lyons, Lee Moran, Neely Edwards and Ford Sterling. Also Star featurettes (1917) with Mary Fuller, Averill Harris & Clara Beyers
 Sterling Film Comedies (1912–1914) – all one-reel
 Tales of the Old West (1923)
 Tempest Cody (1919) – two-reelers with Marie Walcamp
 Tenderfoot (1928–1929) – two reel westerns with George Chandler
 The Texas Rangers (1928–1929) – two-reel westerns with Fred Gilman
 Tom London Westerns (1920–1921)
 Universal featurette (1918–1919) – assorted two and three reelers
 Universal Ike (1914)
 Universal Screen Magazine (followed by “New Screen Magazine”) (1916–1921) – 205 shorts
 Universal Westerns (1917–1925) – additional 2-reelers with various performers
 Victor Film (1912–1916) co-produced with Universal assorted one and two-reelers starring Florence Lawrence and J. Warren Keringan
 Walter Forde Productions (1923)
 William Wolbert as “Willy the Walrus” (1914)

Walt Disney

Films distributed by RKO (1937–1956). Launched Buena Vista Distribution in 1953.
 People & Places (1952–1959)
 True Life Adventure (1948–1959, mostly features after 1953)

Warner Bros.

 Academy of Motion Pictures Arts & Sciences – 2 one-reel documentaries (1948–1950) (Each studio distributed a few of these.)
 Adventures in Africa (1931)
 Al St. John – 4 two-reel comedies (silent, 1920)
 Big Time Vaudeville (1934–1937)
 Big V Comedies (1931–1938) / Girlfriends Comedy (1931–1932) / Gay-ety (1936–1938)
 Bobby Jones How I Play Golf (1931) & How to Break 90 (1933)
 Broadway Brevities (1931–1943) / Broadway Headliners (1937–1938) / Presentation Revue (1938) / Elsa Maxwell Blue Ribbon Comedy (1940) / Warner Specials (& Classics of the Screen) (1943–1956)
 A Dangerous Adventure – 15 part serial (1920)
 E. M. Newman Travelogues (1931–1938)
 Floyd Gibbons Your True Adventure (1937–1939)
 The Grouch Club (1938–1939)
 Howard Hill Bow & Arrow Adventures (1939–1941)
 Joe McDoakes (1942, 1945–1956) - 63 black and white live-action comedy one reel shorts
 Joe Palooka (1936–1937)
 The Lost City of the African Jungle – 15 chapter serial (1919)
 Louise Fazenda Comedies co-starring Chester Conklin made in 1921
 Melody Master (1931–1946) / Memories from Melody Lane (1947) / Hit Parade of the Gay Nineties (1950)
 Miracles of the Jungle – 15 chapter serial (1920)
 Monty Banks Comedies – 15 produced in 1920–21
 The Naggers (1930–1932)
 Pathé News (1947–1956) plus a dozen or so two-reel specials.
 Penrod (1931–1932)
 Rambling 'Round Radio Row (1932–1933)
 Robert Youngson shorts (1948–1956)
 Ripley’s Believe It Or Not (1930–1932)
 Santa Fe Trail Western series with Robert Shayne (1943–1945) (These titles are listed among the Warner Specials and Technicolor Specials )
 S.S. Van Dine Mysteries (1931–1932)
 Scope Gem (1954–1957) / Carl Dudley Stereophonic Special (1953–1954)
 Sport Slants & Sports Thrills (1931–1932) hosted by Ted Husing
 Sports Parade (1940–1956) / Canadian Cameo (1948–1953)
 Technicolor Adventure (1945–1949)
 Technicolor Specials (Warner Bros. series) (1932–1957)
 The Tiger’s Claw – serial (1919)
 Vitaphone. Warners released hundreds of short subjects based on their proprietary sound-on-disc process from 1926 through 1930. The Vitaphone brand survived on later cartoons and other shorts produced with standard optical soundtracks.
 Vitaphone Color Parade (1938–1940) / Mechanix Illustrated / The Immortal Brush
 Vitaphone Pictorial Revue (1936–1938)
 Vitaphone Varieties (1926–1932) / Pepper Pots (1931–1936) / Vitaphone Novelties (1936–1939) / Hollywood Novelties (revived Vitaphone Varieties) (1940–1956)
 Warner Featurettes (1953–1964)
 World Wide Adventures – umbrella title for most of the 1962–1970 live-action shorts

Other series
 The Perils of Our Girl Reporters
 A Long Lane (1917)
 Ace High (1917)
 Birds of Prey (1917)
 Misjudged (1917)
 Outwitted (1917)
 Taking Chances (1917)
 The Black Door (1917)
 The Jade Necklace (1917)
 The Meeting (1917)
 The Schemers (1917)
 The Smite of Conscience (1917)
 The White Trail (1917)
 Many a Slip (1917)
 The Counterfeiters (1917)
 Kidnapped (1917)
 Lieutenant Rose
 Lieutenant Rose and the Robbers of Fingall's Creek (1910)
 Lieutenant Rose and the Foreign Spy (1910)
 Lieutenant Rose and the Gunrunners (1910)
 Lieutenant Rose and the Stolen Submarine (1910)
 Lieutenant Rose and the Chinese Pirates (1910)
 Lieutenant Rose and the Stolen Code (1911)
 Lieutenant Rose and the Boxers (1911)
 Lieutenant Rose and the Royal Visit (1911)
 Lieutenant Rose and the Stolen Ship (1912)
 Lieutenant Rose and the Moorish Raiders (1912)
 Lieutenant Rose and the Hidden Treasure (1912)
 Lieutenant Rose and the Train Wreckers (1912)
 Lieutenant Rose and the Patent Aeroplane (1912)
 Lieutenant Rose in the China Seas (1913)
 Lieutenant Rose and the Stolen Bullion (1913)
 Lieutenant Rose and the Sealed Orders (1914)
 How Lieutenant Rose RN Spiked the Enemy's Guns (1915)
 Terry Kelly
 Glove Slingers (1939)
 Pleased to Mitt You (1940)
 Fresh as a Freshman (1941)
 Glove Affair (1941)
 Mitt Me Tonight (1941)
 The Kink of the Campus (1941)
 Glove Birds (1942)
 A Study in Socks (1942)
 College Belles (1942)
 The Great Glover (1942)
 Socks Appeal (1943)
 His Girl's Worst Friend (1943)
 Lieutenant Daring
 The Adventures of Lieutenant Daring R.N.: In a South American Port (1911)
 Lieutenant Daring R.N. and the Secret Service Agents (1911)
 Lieutenant Daring Avenges an Insult to the Union Jack (1912)
 Lieutenant Daring and the Ship's Mascot (1912)
 Lieutenant Daring Defeats the Middleweight Champion (1912)
 Lieutenant Daring Quells a Rebellion (1912)
 Lieutenant Daring and the Plans of the Mine Fields (1912)
 Lieutenant Daring and the Photographing Pigeon (1912)
 Lieutenant Daring and the Labour Riots (1913)
 Lieutenant Daring and the Dancing Girl (1913)
 Lieutenant Daring and the Mystery of Room 41 (1913)
 Lieutenant Daring, Aerial Scout (1914)
 Lieutenant Daring and the Stolen Invention (1914)
 Lieutenant Daring RN and the Water Rats (1924)
 Lieutenant Daring R.N. (1935)
 Sexton Blake (1928 series)
 The Clue of the Second Goblet (1928)
 Blake the Lawbreaker (1928)
 Sexton Blake, Gambler (1928)
 Silken Threads (1928)
 The Great Office Mystery (1928)
 The Mystery of the Silent Death (1928)
 Sherlock Holmes (1908 silent series)
 Sherlock Holmes (1908)
 Sherlock Holmes II (1908)
 Sherlock Holmes III (1908)
 Sherlock Holmes IV (1909)
 Sherlock Holmes V (1909)
 Sherlock Holmes VI (1910)
 Sexton Blake (1914/1915 series)
 The Mystery of the Diamond Belt (1914)
 The Stolen Heirlooms (1915)
 The Counterfeiters (1915)
 The Great Cheque Fraud (1915)
 The Thornton Jewel Mystery (1915)
 The Wizard of Oz (1910 series)
 The Wonderful Wizard of Oz (1910)
 Dorothy and the Scarecrow in Oz (1910)
 The Land of Oz (1910)
 John Dough and the Cherub (1910)
 Jack Moran
 OHMS: Our Helpless Millions Saved (1914)
 Britain's Naval Secret (1915)
 Parted by the Sword (1915
 London's Enemies (1916)
 The Adventures of François Villon
 The Oubliette (1914)
 The Higher Law (1914)
 Monsieur Bluebeard (1914)
 The Ninety Black Boxes (1914)
 Nick Carter (Silent serials)
 Nick Carter, le roi des détectives (1908)
 Les nouveaux exploits de Nick Carter (1909)
 Nick Carter acrobate (1910)
 Nick Carter - Le mystère du lit blanc (1911)
 Winnie Winkle
 Working Winnie (1926)
 Happy Days (1926)
 Winnie's Birthday (1926)
 Oh! Winnie Behave (1926)
 Winnie's Vacation (1927)
 Winnie Wakes Up (1927)
 Winnie Steps Out (1927)
 Winnie Be Good (1927)
 Winning Winnie (1927)
 Winnie's Winning Ways (1928)
The Lincoln Cycle
My Mother (1917)
My Father (1917)  
Myself (1917) 
Her Country's Call (1917)

References

Sources
 BoxOffice Magazine (release date information in multiple issue “Shorts Charts”) 
 
 
 
 Film Daily Magazine (short film listings) 
  (lists all studio theatrical shorts of the 1930s and 40s)
 
 
 
 
 Motion Picture Herald magazine (short film listings) 
 Motion Pictures 1912-1939 Catalog of Copyright Entries 1951 Library of Congress 
 Motion Pictures 1940-1949 Catalog of Copyright Entries 1953 Library of Congress 
 Motion Pictures 1950-1959 Catalog of Copyright Entries 1960 Library of Congress 
 Motion Pictures 1960-1969 Catalog of Copyright Entries 1971 Library of Congress 
 Motion Picture News Booking Guide, Motion Picture News Inc. (primary editor: William A. Johnston), each edition has a selection of short subject releases:
 April 1922 edition 
 October 1922 edition 
 April 1923 edition 
 October 1923 edition 
 April 1924 edition 
 October 1926 edition 
 Motion Picture News Booking Guide and Studio Directory (October 1927) 
 1929 edition 
 Okuda, Ted & Watz, Edward The Columbia Comedy Shorts: Two-Reel Hollywood Film Comedies, 1933-1958 1998 McFarland & Company

Further reading